Wen Valley (German: Wental) is a typical dry valley of the Schwäbische Alb northwest of Steinheim am Albuch. Wen Valley is a popular recreation area and until 2009 it was popular for cross golf, parkour and bouldering, but this is since June 2009 as compensation for the erection of Essingen Windpark prohibited. Several signs indicate this.

There are several remarkable limestone rocks, which were given names like sphinx, hippopotamus or deer rock. The valley starts near Bartholomä and runs southward.

Heidenheim (district)